Submarine Mountains Management Marine Area, is a protected area in the Pacific Ocean territorial waters of Costa Rica, surrounding the Cocos Island and managed under the Cocos Marine Conservation Area, it was created in 1978 by decree 8748-A.

References 

Nature reserves in Costa Rica
Protected areas established in 1978